Hemiancistrus subviridis, the green phantom pleco, is a species of armored catfish from the family Loricariidae, commonly found in Venezuela. Within Venezuela, it is native to the Orinoco and Casiquiare drainage basins, where it is usually found among granitic rocks in flowing water. The species reaches 15 cm (5.9 inches) SL.

Hemiancistrus subviridis is one of two species referred to by the L-number L-200. The other is Baryancistrus demantoides, which resembles H. subviridis in appearance, and it is this visual similarity that likely historically caused the two to be thought of as the same species, or at least closely related ones, leading them to share an L-number.

References 

Ancistrini
Taxa named by David C. Werneke
Taxa named by Mark Henry Sabaj Pérez 
Taxa named by Nathan Keller Lujan
Taxa named by Jonathan W. Armbruster
Fish described in 2005